Edmund Duggan (1862 – 2 August 1938) was an Irish-born actor and playwright who worked in Australia. He is best known for writing a number of plays with Bert Bailey including The Squatter's Daughter (1907) and On Our Selection (1912). His solo career was less successful than Bailey's. His sister Eugenie was known as "The Queen of Melodrama" and married noted theatre producer William Anderson, for whom Duggan frequently worked as an actor, writer and stage manager.

Between 1892 and 1895 Duggan and South's "Her Majesty's Dramatic Company", toured New South Wales with (inter alia) La Tosca, All for Gold, Greta. His Natural Life and Robbery Under Arms. consistently receiving good notices.

Duggan's wife died two years before he did and he was survived by two daughters.

Select theatre credits
The Democrat (1891) – writer (later revived as Eureka Stockade)
For the Term of his Natural Life (1897) – writer (adapting the novel), (1909) acted (played Maurice Freere)
Cyrano de Bergerac (1902) – acted (played Capt. Carbon de Castel Jaloux)
Lady Audley's Secret (1906)
The Squatter's Daughter, or, The Land of the Wattle (1907) – wrote with Bert Bailey as 'Albert Edmunds'
The Southern Cross (1907) – writer
Man to Man (1908) – actor
The Bushwoman (1909) – acted (played Ned Brandon) and directed
The Man from Outback (1909) – wrote with Bert Bailey as 'Albert Edmunds'
The Chance of a Lifetime (1910) – acted (played trainer Mat Lawson)
The Christian (1911) – acted (played Father Enderby)
My Mate, or a Bush Love Story (1911) – writer
On Our Selection (1912) – wrote with Bert Bailey as 'Albert Edmunds'
The Native Born (1913) – wrote with Bert Bailey as 'Albert Edmunds'
Duncan McClure and the Poor Parson (1916) – acted (played Duncan McClure) (1918) – acted (played Jacob Wattleton)
Gran'dad Rudd (1917) – acted (played Denis Regan)
On Our Selection (1920) (revival) – produced
The Rudd Family by Steele Rudd (1928) – produced, acted

References

External links
Edmund Duggan biography at Australian Dictionary of Biography
Edmund Duggan Australian theatre credits at AusStage
Edmund Duggan at AustLit (subscription required)
Papers of Edmund Duggan at National Library of Australia
Complete copy of The Southern Cross at National Archives of Australia

1862 births
1938 deaths
Australian male actors
Irish emigrants to colonial Australia
People from Lismore, County Waterford
Male actors from Melbourne
Australian male stage actors
Australian male dramatists and playwrights